Mimia is a genus of skippers in the family Hesperiidae.

References

External links

Carcharodini
Hesperiidae genera
Taxa named by William Harry Evans